Roy Lee Schmidt (May 3, 1942 – September 11, 2022) was an American professional football player who was an offensive lineman in the National Football League (NFL) for the New Orleans Saints, Atlanta Falcons, Washington Redskins, and the Minnesota Vikings. He played college football at Long Beach State University and was drafted in the thirteenth round of the 1965 NFL Draft by the Green Bay Packers.

Schmidt was the great uncle of international basketball player, Sami Whitcomb.

References

1942 births
2022 deaths
American football offensive guards
Long Beach State 49ers football players
New Orleans Saints players
Atlanta Falcons players
Washington Redskins players
Minnesota Vikings players
Players of American football from Colorado Springs, Colorado